Welcome to The 624th Regional Support Group

The 624th Regional Support Group, headquartered at Hickam Air Force Base, Hawaii, is one of two Air Force Reserve groups stationed in the Pacific Area of Responsibility and reports directly to the headquarters of the 4th Air Force at March Air Reserve Base, California.

Units
The 624th RSG is composed of a headquarters, four squadrons, and one flight at Hickam Air Force Base, Hawaii, and Andersen Air Force Base, Guam.

The 624th RSG Directorate of Personnel Management provides military personnel flight services to both reserve members and the retired military community.
The 44th Aerial Port Squadron at Andersen AFB, Guam, processes and loads personnel and cargo on any aircraft in the U.S. Air Force or Civil Air Reserve Fleet.
The 48th Aerial Port Squadron at Hickam AFB, Hawaii, deploys personnel to augment fixed port facilities and provide stand-alone air terminal operations worldwide in support of the long war, exercises or contingency operations, unit moves, foreign humanitarian relief or disaster response operations. The unit works in port operations including aircraft loading, cargo processing and inspection, passenger services, aircraft fleet servicing and aerial port command and control.
The 624th Aeromedical Staging Squadron at Hickam AFB, Hawaii, provides medical support and oversight for the entire 624th RSG. Peacetime missions include training to maintain competency and preparedness for both war and peacetime activities. The 624th ASTS deploys qualified medical personnel to augment air staging facilities. The function of an aeromedical staging facility is to provide personnel and equipment necessary for the patient movement required worldwide. 624th ASTS personnel support operations worldwide, including the long war, exercises, humanitarian relief and disaster response operations.
The 624th Civil Engineer Squadron at Hickam AFB, Hawaii, is composed of three Prime Base Engineer Emergency Force teams, seven Firefighting teams and one Readiness team capable of rapid deployment worldwide to construct and maintain airfield facilities, provide firefighting support, and coordinate planning for any disasters.
The 724th Aeromedical Staging Flight at Andersen AFB, Guam, serves as the medical arm of the 624th Regional Support Group with a primary peacetime mission to provide medical support to Reserve organizations to ensure wartime readiness. Its wartime mission is to deploy qualified medical professionals in support of Aerospace Expeditionary Force (AEF) rotations.

History of The Group
The 624th Regional Support Group officially stood up on January 1, 2002. The 624th RSG and its personnel came from multiple sources. Headquarters Air Force Reserve Command formed the group from Det. 1, 604th Regional Support Group. The 604th Aeromedical Staging Squadron (604th ASTS), the 604th Logistics Support Flight (604th LSF), and the 704th Civil Engineer Squadron (704th CES) at Hickam AFB, HI, became the 624th Aeromedical Staging Squadron (624 ASTS), 624th Logistics Support Flight (624th LSF) (inactivated) and 624th Civil Engineer Squadron (624 CES). The 604th ASTS Operating Location (OL)-A and Det. 1, 604th LSF at Andersen AFB, Guam, became the 724th Aeromedical Staging Flight (724th ASTF) and 724th Logistics Support Flight (724th LSF) (since inactivated). The 48th Aerial Port Squadron (48th APS) at Hickam and the 44th Aerial Port Squadron (44th APS) at Andersen both retained their designations.

References

Resources
 624th RSG Official Factsheet

External links
 624th RSG Official Website

Support groups of the United States Air Force